Jan Maas (2 April 1911 Batavia, Dutch East Indies – 31 December 1962, New York) was a sailor from the Netherlands, who represented his native country at the 1932 Summer Olympics in Los Angeles. Maas competed, with his Brother Bob Maas as helmsman, in the Star, he took the 6th place. The Maas brothers took part at their own cost.

Jan Maas is the younger brother of Bob Maas.

Sources
 
 
 
 

1911 births
1962 deaths
Dutch male sailors (sport)

Sailors at the 1932 Summer Olympics – Star
Olympic sailors of the Netherlands
People from Batavia, Dutch East Indies
Dutch emigrants to the United States